Funke Bucknor-Obruthe (born 27 June 1976) is a Nigerian entrepreneur and lawyer. She is the founder and CEO of Zapphaire Events and is regarded as one of Nigeria's pioneering event planners.

Early life and education
Bucknor-Obruthe was born to Segun and Shola Bucknor in Lagos State, Southwestern Nigeria. She began her basic and secondary school education at Fountain Nursery and Primary School, Lagos, and Nigeria Navy Secondary School, Lagos, before she proceeded to study Law at the University of Lagos. In 2000, she was called to bar after attending the Nigerian Law School in Abuja.

Career
After practising law briefly, Bucknor-Obruthe was employed at Tie Communications, an advertisement agency, where she worked for a short period. In 2003, her love for event planning made her start Zapphaire Events, an independent event planning enterprise. She has since gone on to plan and organize several high-profile events within and outside Nigeria and has won awards and recognition including being featured in CNN's Inside Africa for planning a Nigerian royal wedding. Some of these include the Future Award for "Entrepreneur of the Year" (2006), the Wedding Planner Magazine Award for "Wedding Planner of the Year" (2007), Go2girl Life Achievement Awards (2011), Nigerian Events Awards for Outstanding Contribution to the Events Industry (2012).

Books
The Essential Bridal Handbook

Recognitions
In 2014, Nigerian online magazine YNaija listed Bucknor-Obruthe in its "10 Most Powerful Under-40s in Business". In 2016, she was listed in the BBC's 100 Women series.

Personal life
Bucknor-Obruthe is married to Onome Obruthe, with whom she has two children. She is the elder sister of Nigerian media personality Tosyn Bucknor.

References

1976 births
Living people
Businesspeople from Lagos State
University of Lagos alumni
Nigerian Law School alumni
Nigerian women lawyers
Nigerian women writers
BBC 100 Women
Funke
Event planners